Melaleuca subalaris is a plant in the myrtle family, Myrtaceae, and is endemic to the south of Western Australia. It is distinguished by its small, decussate leaves and small flower heads which rarely have more than one flower in each inflorescence.

Description
Its leaves are arranged in alternating pairs, each pair at right angles to the ones above and below (decussate) so that the leaves form four rows along the stems.

The flowers are white to pale yellow and arranged on the side branches. The stamens are arranged in five bundles around the flowers and there are 8 to 18 stamens per bundle.

Taxonomy and naming
Melaleuca subalaris was first formally described in 1988 by Bryan Barlow in Australian Systematic Botany. The specific epithet (subalaris) is from the Latin word alaris meaning "of the wing" and the prefix -sub meaning “under” referring to the flowers being in a spike rather than axillary.

Distribution and habitat
This melaleuca occurs in and between the Peak Charles, Zanthus and Esperance districts in the Coolgardie, Esperance Plains, Mallee biogeographic regions. It grows in clay or sandy soils on the edges of salt pans.

Conservation
Melaleuca subalaris is listed as "not threatened" by the Government of Western Australia Department of Parks and Wildlife.

References

subalaris
Myrtales of Australia
Plants described in 1988
Endemic flora of Western Australia